Liberty is an unincorporated community in Yakima County, Washington, United States, located approximately two miles east of Granger.

References

Unincorporated communities in Yakima County, Washington
Unincorporated communities in Washington (state)